Tennessee's 8th Senate district is one of 33 districts in the Tennessee Senate. It has been represented by Republican Frank Niceley since 2012. It is currently the most Republican-leaning Senate district in the state.

Geography
District 8 covers much of rural East Tennessee in between Knoxville and the Tri-Cities, including all of Claiborne, Grainger, Hancock, Hawkins, Jefferson, and Union Counties. Communities in the district include Jefferson City, Church Hill, Mount Carmel, Harrogate, Strawberry Plains, Rogersville, New Tazewell, Bean Station, Dandridge, Maynardville, Sneedville, and some of Kingsport.

The district overlaps with Tennessee's 1st, 2nd, and 3rd congressional districts, and with the 9th, 11th, 17th, 35th, and 36th  districts of the Tennessee House of Representatives. It borders the states of Kentucky and Virginia.

Recent election results
Tennessee Senators are elected to staggered four-year terms, with odd-numbered districts holding elections in midterm years and even-numbered districts holding elections in presidential years.

2020

2016

2012

Federal and statewide results in District 8

References

8
Claiborne County, Tennessee
Grainger County, Tennessee
Hancock County, Tennessee
Hawkins County, Tennessee
Jefferson County, Tennessee
Union County, Tennessee